Natalie Lloyd (born February 2) is a New York Times bestselling children's author. Lloyd lives in Chattanooga, Tennessee, with her husband and dogs. She was born in Tennessee with a condition called osteogenesis imperfecta, or brittle bone disease, which means she only grew to 4 foot 11 inches tall and used either a walker or a wheelchair until seventh grade. She did a degree in journalism in college. She writes children's novels, including her novel A Snicker of Magic which was a New York Times bestseller.

Bibliography
A Snicker of Magic (2014)
The Key to Extraordinary (2016)
Over the Moon (2019)

Series
 The Problim Children (2018)
 Carnival Catastrophe (2019)
 Island in the Stars (2020)

References and sources

Living people
Year of birth missing (living people)
People from Chattanooga, Tennessee
People with osteogenesis imperfecta